Spheroolithidae is an oofamily of dinosaur eggs. It contains Guegoolithus, Spheroolithus, and Paraspheroolithus. Like modern birds, the eggshell membrane formed before the calcareous part of the shell.

See also 
List of dinosaur oogenera

References 

Egg fossils
Dinosaur reproduction